The Battle of Axtorna or simply Axtorna, was a battle fought between the Kingdom of Sweden and Denmark-Norway 20 October  1565 at Axtorna, a small village in what is today Falkenberg Municipality, Halland County in south-western Sweden.

Background

The battle
The Danish commander Daniel Rantzau had been forced to yield the fortress Varberghus to the Swedes on 15 September 1565, after they had taken Ny Varberg, then Halland's largest city. Rantzau received the news that a Swedish army of superior strength led by Jacob Henriksson Hästesko was approaching from the east, forcing him to move his forces toward  Falkenberg. Rantzau had decided to commit to combat since the Swedish force had just arrived from its march and hadn't rearranged into a militarily cohesive unit.

Aftermath
The Danes won as a consequence of their superior cavalry tactic and Rantzau became a renowned general after the battle and throughout the war. Despite the victory and the capture of the Swedish artillery, the Danish had suffered great losses and stayed near the battlefield for a week, while large portions of the Swedish army were intact.

References

External links
The Axtorna project
 arkeologiuv.se

1565 in Denmark
Axtorna
Axtorna
Axtorna
Axtorna
1560s in Sweden